The canton of Aniche is an administrative division of the Nord department, northern France. It was created at the French canton reorganisation which came into effect in March 2015. Its seat is in Aniche.

It consists of the following communes:

Aniche
Arleux
Auberchicourt
Aubigny-au-Bac
Brunémont
Bugnicourt
Cantin
Dechy
Écaillon
Erchin
Estrées
Féchain
Férin
Fressain
Gœulzin
Guesnain
Hamel
Lécluse
Lewarde
Loffre
Marcq-en-Ostrevent
Masny
Monchecourt
Montigny-en-Ostrevent
Roucourt
Villers-au-Tertre

References

Cantons of Nord (French department)